Liga Deportiva Universitaria de Quito's 2001 season was the club's 71st year of existence, the 48th year in professional football, and the 3rd in the second level of professional football in Ecuador.

Kits
Supplier: Umbro
Sponsor(s): Parmalat

Squad

Competitions

Serie B

First stage

Results

Second stage

Aggregate table

References
RSSSF - 2001 Serie B

External links
Official Site 
LDU Quito in the Serie B 2001 (1)
LDU Quito in the Serie B 2001 (2)
LDU Quito (3) - Deportivo Saquisilí (1) All goals

2001
Ldu